Waganiec  is a village in Aleksandrów County, Kuyavian-Pomeranian Voivodeship, in north-central Poland. It is the seat of the gmina (administrative district) called Gmina Waganiec.

References

Villages in Aleksandrów County